Georges Kramer (born 1898) was a Swiss footballer and coach.

Biography 
Georges Kramer, like his brothers Auguste and Edmond, was a Swiss international, before continuing his career in France.

He made his debut for FC Cantonal Neuchâtel, ancestor of Neuchâtel Xamax FC, before playing for Grasshopper-Club Zurich, and then FC Bienne.

He left Bienne to join FC Cette in 1922. With the Dauphins, he took part in an exceptional season, winning the Championship from the Ligue du Sud Est and reaching the final of the Coupe de France. However, he was involved in an infamous "affair" in 1923. The sétois club, before the advent of professionalism in French football, were accused of shamateurism.

Georges Kramer left for Gallia Club Lunel, a team who aspired to play in the highest levels of the league. He joined the club, in 1924, with his two brothers. He was also joint manager with French international Fernand Brunel.

The three Kramer brothers also left for SO Montpellier. The number of foreign players were limited to three per team to play in the Coupe de France, so Georges took French citizenship. He played in the Coupe de France in 1929, against the team's great rival of the time, FC Sète. The brothers Auguste and Edmond Kramer scored two goals in the win.

Honours 
 Swiss Champion in 1916 with Cantonal Neuchâtel and in 1921 with Grasshopper Club Zürich
 Finalist of the Coupe de France 1923 with FC Cette
 Champion of the Ligue du Sud-Est DH in 1923 with FC Cette and in 1928 with SO Montpellier
 Winner of the Coupe de France in 1929 with SO Montpellier

References 

1898 births
Date of death unknown
Association football forwards
Swiss men's footballers
Switzerland international footballers
Neuchâtel Xamax FCS players
Grasshopper Club Zürich players
FC Sète 34 players
Montpellier HSC players
Nîmes Olympique players
Swiss football managers
FC Martigues managers
Montpellier HSC managers
FC Lyon players